Bajada del Agrio is a village and municipality in the Picunches department in Neuquén Province in southwestern Argentina. It is located on the  Agrio River, a tributary of the Neuquén River, 60 km north of Zapala through Provincial Route (RP) 14, is also close to the RP 10 and RN 40.

Population
Bajada del Agrio had 656 inhabitants (INDEC, 2001), which represented an increase of 48% over the previous census when there were 443 inhabitants (INDEC, 1991).

References

Populated places in Neuquén Province